Morsea piute, the piute monkey grasshopper, is a species of monkey grasshopper in the family Eumastacidae. It is found in North America.

References

Eumastacidae
Articles created by Qbugbot
Insects described in 1958